Nour El Ain is Egyptian singer Amr Diab's most successful album. It was released in January 1996 and became a tremendous success not only in the Middle East but worldwide. The album was recognized at the World Music Awards for the best-selling album in the Middle East for 1996.

Nour El Ain
The title track and its English version "Habibi", was an international phenomenon, becoming a crossover hit in Pakistan, India, Brazil, Iran, Argentina, Chile, France, and South Africa. The song was remixed by several European arrangers and has become a big pull on the dance floors of Europe. The video clip, also produced by Alam El Phan for the song "Nour El Ain", was one of the most lavish and expensive productions in Egyptian pop music at the time. "Nour El Ain" was at the time the best selling album ever released by a Middle Eastern artist.

Track listing
"Ewediny " - 5:25
"Leela Men omry" - 4:56
"Men Awel Mara" - 4:35
"Mesh Had3af" - 5:25
"Nafs El Makan" - 4:40
"Nour El Ain" - 5:09
"Yomenhom" - 3:48
"Ayzeen Yeghayyarook" - 5:53

References

Amr Diab albums
1996 albums
Arabic-language albums